Giambattista Vasco (10 October 1733 – 11 November 1796) was an Italian economist and abbot.

Works

Bibliography

See also 
 

1733 births
1796 deaths
Italian abbots
Italian economists
People from Mondovì